Cory Deagle is a Canadian politician, who was elected to the Legislative Assembly of Prince Edward Island in the 2019 Prince Edward Island general election. He represents the district of Montague-Kilmuir as a member of the Progressive Conservative Party of Prince Edward Island.

Electoral record

References 

Living people
Progressive Conservative Party of Prince Edward Island MLAs
People from Queens County, Prince Edward Island
21st-century Canadian politicians
Year of birth missing (living people)